Kuliki is a rural locality (a village) in Volkovsky Selsoviet, Blagoveshchensky District, Bashkortostan, Russia. The population was 34 as of the 2010 census. There is 1 street.

Geography 
Kuliki is located 42 km northeast of Blagoveshchensk (the district's administrative centre) by road. Volkovo is the nearest rural locality.

References 

Rural localities in Blagoveshchensky District